Bonaventure "Buddy" Amendola (April 3, 1930 – September 24, 1994) was an American football coach.  He served as the seventh head football at Central Connecticut State University in New Britain, Connecticut and he held that position for five seasons, from 1982 until 1986.  His coaching record at Central Connecticut was 14–34–1.

Amendola died on September 24, 1994, at the Hospital of Saint Raphael in New Haven, Connecticut.

Head coaching record

College

References

External links
 

1930 births
1994 deaths
Central Connecticut Blue Devils football coaches
Columbia Lions football coaches
UConn Huskies football coaches
UConn Huskies football players
Yale Bulldogs football coaches
High school football coaches in Connecticut
Columbia University alumni
Fairfield University alumni
People from Derby, Connecticut
Players of American football from Connecticut